Edline Mutumbami (born 13 October 1996) is a Zimbabwean footballer who plays as a defender for Blue Swallows FC and the Zimbabwe women's national team.

Club career
Mutumbami has played for Blue Swallows in Zimbabwe.

International career
Mutumbami capped for Zimbabwe at senior level during the 2021 COSAFA Women's Championship.

References

1996 births
Living people
Zimbabwean women's footballers
Women's association football defenders
Zimbabwe women's international footballers